Mudhal Udhayam is a 1995 Indian Tamil-language film directed by Prithviraj and produced by Gawri and Ramamurthy. The film stars Arjun and Suman Ranganathan. It was released on 10 February 1995.

Plot

Cast 
Arjun as Seenu
Suman Ranganathan as Geetha
R. P. Vishwam as Naina
Yuvashree
Delhi Ganesh
Senthil
Vennira Aadai Moorthy as Geetha's father

Soundtrack 
The music was composed by the duo Shankar–Ganesh.

Release and reception 
Mudhal Udhayam was censored on 7 October 1993; however delays meant that the film was released on 10 February 1995. K. Vijiyan of New Straits Times wrote, "Despite the tight censorship laws in India, crooked politicians and policemen remain favourite topics for Tamil and Telugu movie makers. Prithivaraj's attempt here is nothing much to shout about as he does not attempt a fresh angle on such occurrences."

References

External links 
 

1990s Tamil-language films
1995 films
Films scored by Shankar–Ganesh
Indian action films